Soodabeh Salem (also Sudabeh Salam, born 1954 in Tehran) is an Iranian musician, piano player and the conductor of Iran's Children Orchestra.

Salem succeeded in founding an orchestra to promote Children's music despite numerous difficulties. Her orchestra's performance was praised in Fajr Music Festival (2007).

She designed and taught music therapy classes for children of Bam. She has also collaborated with UNICEF for one year.

Notes

See also
Music of Iran
List of famous Persian women

1954 births
Living people
Iranian pianists
Iranian women musicians
Musicians from Tehran
21st-century pianists
Iranian music arrangers
21st-century women pianists